Bertalan Zsótér (6 July 1906 – 20 December 1980) was a Hungarian sports shooter. He competed in the 50 m pistol event at the 1936 Summer Olympics.

References

1906 births
1980 deaths
Hungarian male sport shooters
Olympic shooters of Hungary
Shooters at the 1936 Summer Olympics
People from Bečej
20th-century Hungarian people